The Congolese National Convention, also known as CONACO, was a federalist political alliance in the Democratic Republic of the Congo. It was formed and led by then Prime Minister, Moïse Tshombe.

It consisted of a bloc of forty-nine parties from among the more than 200 parties that were formed primarily for participation in the 1965 general elections. CONACO primarily drew its strength from the southern portions of the country and succeeded the Katanga-based CONAKAT party.

Election results

See also
 Political parties in the Democratic Republic of the Congo

References

Defunct political party alliances in Africa
Political party alliances in the Democratic Republic of the Congo